Kenneth Frith (born December 1, 1945) is an American-born Canadian football player who played professionally for the Saskatchewan Roughriders.

References

1945 births
Living people
Saskatchewan Roughriders players